Kampong Sungai Hanching is a village in Brunei-Muara District, Brunei. The population was 2,987 in 2016. It is one of the villages within Mukim Berakas 'B'. The postcode is BC2115.

Facilities 
Haji Mohd Salleh Primary School is the village's government primary school. It also shares grounds with Haji Mohd Salleh Religious School, the village's government school for the country's Islamic religious primary education.

The village mosque is Kampong Sungai Hanching Mosque; it was inaugurated on 12 November 1982 and can accommodate 1,400 worshippers.

References 

Sungai Hanching